Bettina Geysen (born 17 July 1969) has been president of Spirit, a Flemish political party, since 2007. She succeeded Geert Lambert as president. Previously she worked in the media as a journalist and was director of the één television channel of Flemish public broadcaster VRT.

Sources

External links
Wie is wie Spirit home page 

1969 births
Living people
Sociaal-Liberale Partij politicians
People from Wilrijk